Canadian Mennonite University (CMU) is a private Mennonite university located in Winnipeg, Manitoba, Canada. It is affiliated with Mennonite Church Canada and the Mennonite Brethren Church of Manitoba. It has an enrolment of 1,607 students. The university was chartered in 1999 with a Shaftesbury campus in southwest Winnipeg, as well as Menno Simons College and a campus at the University of Winnipeg.

History
Canadian Mennonite University was incorporated in 1999, through the amalgamation of Canadian Mennonite Bible College (founded in 1947), Concord College (founded as Mennonite Brethren Bible College in 1944), and Menno Simons College (founded in 1988). A fourth college, Steinbach Bible College, was also involved, but later withdrew.

The name, Canadian Mennonite University, was formally announced in early 2000 and classes began in September of that year on a new campus, composed of the campus of Canadian Mennonite Bible College on the south-west corner of Grant and Shaftesbury and the former campus of the Manitoba School for the Deaf.

In 2009, Canadian Mennonite University opened a new Menno Simons College campus on Portage Avenue. In late 2010, a science laboratory was constructed and in 2011 the Redekop School of Business was opened.

Academic programs

Degrees
Canadian Mennonite University offers several degrees, including:
Bachelor of Arts
Bachelor of Science
Bachelor of Business Administration
Bachelor of Music
Bachelor of Music Therapy
Master of Arts in Theological Studies or Christian Ministry
Master of Business Administration
Master of Peacebuilding and Collaborative Development

Schools and colleges
Canadian School of Peacebuilding
Community School of Music & the Arts
Menno Simons College
Outtatown School of Discipleship
Redekop School of Business

Sports
The university is represented by the CMU Blazers in soccer, volleyball and basketball. Teams play in the Manitoba Colleges Athletic Conference (formerly the Central Plains Athletic Conference).

Notable alumni
Di Brandt - poet
Howard Dyck - conductor and radio broadcaster
Beth Goobie - Canadian poet and writer
Jan Guenther Braun - writer
Chris Huebner - Associate Professor of Theology and Philosophy at Canadian Mennonite University; co-editor of the Polyglossia series in Herald-Press
Sarah Klassen - Canadian author
Royden Loewen - historian
Leonard Ratzlaff - choral conductor for Edmonton's Richard Eaton Singers
A. James Reimer - Canadian Mennonite theologian; held a dual academic appointment as Professor of Religious Studies and Christian Theology at Conrad Grebel University College
Katie Funk Wiebe, writer
Rudy Wiebe - Canadian author; Professor Emeritus in the Department of English at the University of Alberta since 1992

See also

General Conference Mennonite Church
Mennonite Church Canada
Mennonite Brethren Church
List of universities in Manitoba
Higher education in Manitoba
Education in Canada

References

Further reading
Harder, Helmut.  "CMU: The Emergence of a Mennonite University." in The Blazer Alumni Magazine, Fall 2010.

External links

Mennonite schools in Manitoba
Universities and colleges in Winnipeg
Universities and colleges affiliated with the Mennonite Church
Private universities and colleges in Canada
Educational institutions established in 1999
1999 establishments in Manitoba
Tuxedo, Winnipeg